Delhi Public School, Bilaspur  (est: 2004) is located in Tifra, Bilaspur, in the state of Chhattisgarh, India. During 2020-21 Delhi Public School decided to give all 12th students more than 95 percent

The schools current principal is Bharat Ratna Shree Vasco da Gama.

History
School was founded by Industrialist and Philanthropist Late Chaudhary Sri. Ch. Mitter Sen Sindhu Ji in 2004 under Sindhu Education Foundation that runs several educational trusts and institutes under Indus Group of Institutions and Param Mitra Manav Nirman Sansthan.

Current trustee and chairman of the school is founder Ch. Mitter Sen Sindhu's son, politician Abhimanyu Sindhu.

Description
School is affiliated with Delhi Public School Society (one of the largest institutions providing education at school level in India) and  Central Board of Secondary Education, New Delhi (CBSE).

The school's 10.4 acre campus is located at Tifra, Raipur Road, Bilaspur, Chhattisgarh, India. The school has well equipped laboratories, libraries, computer rooms, digital smart classroom, sports facilities, music room, medical treatment room and school transport. The school has air-conditioned boarding facilities for 150 students (100 boys and 50 girls) in two-storied buildings monitored by Hostel Warden, Dorm Masters and Dorm Mistress.

See also
 Abhimanyu Sindhu
 Indus Group of Institutions
 Param Mitra Manav Nirman Sansthan

References

External links
 

Delhi Public School Society
Private schools in Chhattisgarh
Education in Bilaspur, Chhattisgarh
Educational institutions established in 2004
2004 establishments in Chhattisgarh